Olivella mutica, common name the variable dwarf olive, is a species of small sea snail, marine gastropod mollusk in the subfamily Olivellinae, in the family Olividae, the olives.  Species in the genus Olivella are commonly called dwarf olives.

References

External links 

mutica
Gastropods described in 1822